Eleutherodactylus pinarensis is a species of frog in the family Eleutherodactylidae. It endemic to Cuba and known from scattered localities in the western part of the island as well as from Isla de la Juventud (its type locality, formerly Isla de Pinos). Common name Pinos robber frog has been coined for it.

Description
Eleutherodactylus pinarensis is a relatively large species. The tympanum is relatively large, nearly as large as the eye. Fingers III and IV have developed disks. Toes are without webbing.  Skin is uniformly shagreened above whereas the belly is feebly rugose. Coloration is marbled dark and light with indications of crossbars or dorso-lateral light lines.

Specimens described by Dunn as "cross-barred juveniles" were later described as a separate species, Eleutherodactylus klinikowskii.

Habitat and conservation
Eleutherodactylus pinarensis occurs in rocky areas, coastal cliffs, and caves in mesic forests. It does not occur outside forest habitat. It is an uncommon species. It is threatened by habitat disturbance caused by tourist activities, including infrastructure development for tourism. It occurs in the Guanahacabibes National Park and in several other protected areas.

References

pinarensis
Endemic fauna of Cuba
Amphibians of Cuba
Amphibians described in 1926
Taxa named by Emmett Reid Dunn
Taxonomy articles created by Polbot